Shannon Doepking is an American, former collegiate right-handed softball catcher and current head coach at Syracuse. She played her college softball at Tennessee, helping them to a runner up finish at the 2007 Women's College World Series.

Coaching career

Amherst
Doepking served as head coach at Amherst College for one year, and led the program to a 21–11 record.

Dartmouth
On August 5, 2014, Doepking was named the new head coach of the Dartmouth softball program.

Syracuse
On September 14, 2018, Doepking was named the new head coach of the Syracuse Orange softball program.

Head coaching record

College

References

Living people
Year of birth missing (living people)
Female sports coaches
Softball players from California
American softball coaches
Tennessee Volunteers softball players
Fairleigh Dickinson Knights softball coaches
Stony Brook Seawolves softball coaches
Amherst Mammoths softball coaches
Dartmouth Big Green softball coaches
Syracuse Orange softball coaches